A person who is corrupt is or has been spiritually or morally impure, or is acting/has acted illegally. By extension, the term is applied to a database or program being made unreliable by errors or alterations.

Corrupt may also refer to:

 Corrupt (1983 film), an Italian thriller film
 Corrupt (1999 film), an American crime film
 "Corrupt" (Angel), an unproduced television episode

See also

 Corruption (disambiguation)
 Corruptor (disambiguation)
 Data corruption
 Kurupt